Charles Arthur Fairweather (1878 – February 12, 1939) was an American football player and coach.  He served as the head football coach at Washington University in St. Louis in 1905 and at Beloit College in Beloit, Wisconsin from 1906 to 1907, compiling a career college football coaching record of 12–13–3. Fairweather played college football at the University of Illinois, where he was team captain in 1904.

Head coaching record

References

External links
 

1878 births
1939 deaths
American football guards
Beloit Buccaneers athletic directors
Beloit Buccaneers football coaches
Illinois Fighting Illini football players
Washington University Bears football coaches